The Inter-American Convention Against Corruption (IACAC) was adopted by the member countries of the Organization of American States on 29 March 1996; it came into force on 6 March 1997.
It was the first international convention to address the question of corruption.

According to Article II of the convention's text, it has two goals:
To promote and strengthen the development by each of the States Parties of the mechanisms needed to prevent, detect, punish and eradicate corruption; and,
To promote, facilitate and regulate cooperation among the States Parties to ensure the effectiveness of measures and actions to prevent, detect, punish and eradicate  corruption in the performance of public functions and acts of corruption specifically related to such performance.

See also
United Nations Convention against Corruption of 31 October 2003

References

External links
Inter-American Convention Against Corruption
IACAC signatures and ratifications

Organization of American States treaties
Treaties concluded in 1996
Treaties entered into force in 1997
Anti-corruption agencies
Treaties of Argentina
Treaties of Antigua and Barbuda
Treaties of the Bahamas
Treaties of Belize
Treaties of Bolivia
Treaties of Brazil
Treaties of Canada
Treaties of Chile
Treaties of Colombia
Treaties of Costa Rica
Treaties of Dominica
Treaties of the Dominican Republic
Treaties of Ecuador
Treaties of El Salvador
Treaties of Grenada
Treaties of Guatemala
Treaties of Guyana
Treaties of Haiti
Treaties of Honduras
Treaties of Jamaica
Treaties of Mexico
Treaties of Nicaragua
Treaties of Panama
Treaties of Paraguay
Treaties of Peru
Treaties of Saint Kitts and Nevis
Treaties of Saint Lucia
Treaties of Saint Vincent and the Grenadines
Treaties of Suriname
Treaties of Trinidad and Tobago
Treaties of the United States
Treaties of Uruguay
Treaties of Venezuela
1996 in Venezuela